7O or 7-O may refer to:

 7O, IATA code for Galaxy Air
 7O-ADJ, tail number for plane involved in Yemenia Flight 626
 7O, code for Yemen in Aircraft registration codes
 Venezuela's 2012 presidential elections of 7 October

See also

O7 (disambiguation)